Luther Lochman von Wedekind (1864 – November 24, 1935) was medical director for the United States Navy. He was Commander of the hospital ship Solace.

Biography
He was born in 1864 and graduated from Columbia University Medical School in 1886. He died on November 24, 1935 of myocarditis.

References

1864 births
1935 deaths
Columbia University Vagelos College of Physicians and Surgeons alumni